Secret Identities: The Asian American Superhero Anthology is a comics anthology edited by Jeff Yang, Parry Shen, Keith Chow, and Jerry Ma that brings together leading Asian American creators in the comics industry—including Gene Yang (National Book Award finalist for American Born Chinese), Bernard Chang (Wonder Woman), Greg Pak (Hulk), and Christine Norrie (Black Canary Wedding Special)—to craft original graphical short stories set in a compelling "shadow history" of our country: from the building of the railroads to the Japanese American internment, the Vietnam airlift, the murder of Vincent Chin, and the incarceration of Wen Ho Lee.

In October 2010, the editors announced they had begun work on a second anthology entitled Secret Identities Volume 2: Shattered. Production on Volume 2 was due in part to a grant from The Vilcek Foundation. Shattered was released in November 2012.

Promotion
Creators Larry Hama, Christine Norrie, Jef Castro, Keith Chow, Cliff Chiang and Jerry Ma, who all contributed work to Secret Identities, appeared at a book signing at Midtown Comics Times Square in Manhattan, on May 23, 2009 to promote the book.

Contributors

 A.L. Baroza
 Alex Joon Kim
 Alex Tarampi
 Alexander Shen
 Anthony Tan
 Anthony Wu
 Anuj Shrestha
 Benton Jew
 Bernard Chang
 Billy Tan
 Chi-Yun Lau
 Christine Norrie
 Clarence Coo
 Cliff Chiang
 Daniel Jai Lee
 Deodato Pangandoyon
 Dustin Nguyen
 Erwin Haya
 Francis Tsai
 Gene Yang
 Glenn Urieta
 Greg LaRocque
 Greg Pak
 Hellen Jo
 Ian Kim
 Jamie Ford
 Jason Sperber
 Jef Castro
 Jeff Yang
 Jeremy Arambulo
 Jerry Ma
 Jimmy Aquino
 Johann Choi
 John Franzese
 John Kuramoto
 Jonathan Tsuei
 Kazu Kibuishi
 Keiko Agena
 Keith Chow
 Kelly Hu
 Ken Wong
 Koji Steven Sakai
 Kripa Joshi
 Larry Hama
 Leonardo Nam
 Lynn Chen
 Martin Hsu
 Michael Kang
 Ming Doyle
 Naeem Mohaimen
 Nick Huang
 Parry Shen
 Paul Wei
 Raymond Sohn
 Sarah Sapang
 Sonny Liew
 Sung Kang
 Tak Toyoshima
 Tanuj Chopra
 Ted Chung
 Tiffanie Hwang
 Vince Sunico
 Walden Wong
 Yul Kwon

Notes

External links
 
 Secret Identities Official Blog
 April 2009 Secret Identities interview with Asiaxpress.com
 Spotlight on Comics: Secret Identities

2009 graphic novels
2009 comics debuts
American graphic novels
Comics anthologies
Comics by Greg Pak
Asian-American literature
The New Press books